Hugo José García Hernández is a Venezuelan diplomat, a former Ambassador of Venezuela to Russia and the first Ambassador of Venezuela to Abkhazia.

García Hernández presented his credentials to Russian President Dmitry Medvedev on 27 February 2009. On 12 July 2010, he presented his credentials to President of Abkhazia Sergei Bagapsh as Venezuela's first Ambassador to Abkhazia.

References

Living people
Ambassadors of Venezuela to Russia
Ambassadors of Venezuela to Abkhazia
Year of birth missing (living people)